Jean Wauquelin (active in the 15th century), born in Picardy, was a writer and translator in French, active in the County of Hainaut in the Burgundian Netherlands, a county now located in Belgium near the border with France.  Wauquelin died on 7 September 1452 in Mons, Hainaut. His date of birth remains unknown.

He translated into French the Chronica ducum Lotharingiae et Brabantiae of Edmond de Dynter, the Historia regum Britanniae of Geoffrey of Monmouth, and the Annales historiae illustrium principum Hannoniae of Jacques de Guyse.

Jean Wauquelin also put into prose the Manekine of Philippe de Beaumanoir, the Belle Hélène de Constantinople, and produced a compilation of French romances of Alexander the Great in his Livre des conquestes et faits d'Alexandre le Grand ("Book of the conquests and deeds of Alexander the Great").

Works
 La geste ou histore du noble roy Alixandre, roy de Macedonne

References

External links 

15th-century translators
15th-century writers
Belgian male writers
Latin–French translators
1452 deaths